Don L. Ipson is an American politician. A Republican, he serves and represents the 29th District of the Utah State Senate. He was previously a member of the Utah House of Representatives representing District 75 from 2009 to 2016.

Personal life and career
Ipson attended Panguitch High School and later earned his BA in Accounting and Business Administration from the LDS Business College. Ipson lives in St. George, Utah with his wife. He has four sons and ten grandchildren. He works in transportation, and is the CEO of DATS Trucking Inc.

He participates in many organizations, including the Southern Utah Trucking Association (past president); Utah Trucking Association (past president); Dixie ATC (director and past chair); Utah College of Applied Technology (past chair); UDOT Motor Carrier Advisory Board (chairman); UHP Honorary Colonels (past chair); and the St. George Lions Club.

Political career
2008 When District 75 incumbent Republican Representative Stephen H. Urquhart ran for Utah State Senate and left the seat open, Ipson was selected from among four candidates by the Republican convention and was unopposed for the November 4, 2008 General election, winning with 10,613 votes.
2010 Ipson was unopposed for the June 22, 2010 Republican Primary and won the November 2, 2010 General election with 6,975 votes (83.9%) against Democratic nominee Jerry Howard.
2012 Ipson was unopposed for the June 26, 2012 Republican Primary and won the three-way November 6, 2012 General election with 10,299 votes (78.7%) against Democratic nominee Cimarron Chacon and Constitution candidate Randall Hinton.
2014 Ipson was unopposed for the Republican convention and won in the November 4, 2014 General election with 4,680 votes (65.5%) against Independent American nominee Nihla Judd, and Democratic nominee Cheryl Hawker.
2016 Ipson was appointed to replace Steve Urquhart in the Utah State Senate.

2016 sponsored legislation

Ipson also floor sponsored SB0036 Postretirement Employment Exceptions, SB0094 Law Enforcement Use of Body Cameras, SB0131S03 Utah College of Applied Technology Governance Amendments,  SB0132 Commercial Driver License Amendments, SB0136S02 Division of Occupational and Professional Licensing Amendments, SB0183 Department of Public Safety Amendments, SB0190 Open and Public Meetings Law Revisions, SB019401 Vehicle Registration and Insurance Amendments, and SB0197S01 Resale of Procurement Item Amendments.

References

External links
Official page at the Utah State Legislature

Don Ipson at Ballotpedia
Don L. Ipson at the National Institute on Money in State Politics

Place of birth missing (living people)
Year of birth missing (living people)
Living people
Ensign College alumni
Republican Party members of the Utah House of Representatives
People from St. George, Utah
21st-century American politicians